Lounis Lanseur (born 16 January 1989) is a former professional footballer who played as a defender. Born in France, he represented Algeria at international level.

Club career
Born in Saint-Étienne, France, Lanseur began his career at age 9 with his hometown club of AS Saint-Étienne. He worked his way up the ranks of the club and became the captain of the reserve team in the 2009–10 season. In the summer of 2010, when he was not offered a professional contract by the club, he left to join FC Libourne-Saint-Seurin.

In January 2011, Lanseur was linked with a move to ES Sétif. However, a month later, he ended up signing with another Algerian club, USM Blida.

International career
On 9 August 2009, Lanseur was called up by head coach Abdelhak Benchikha to the Algeria Under-23 national team for a week long training camp in Blida. He was called up again later that month for another training camp.

References

External links
 
 DZFoot Profile
 

Living people
1989 births
Kabyle people
French people of Kabyle descent
Algerian footballers
French footballers
Footballers from Saint-Étienne
Association football defenders
Algeria under-23 international footballers
Algerian Ligue Professionnelle 1 players
Championnat National 2 players
Championnat National 3 players
AS Saint-Étienne players
FC Libourne players
USM Blida players
SA Thiers players
Andrézieux-Bouthéon FC players